Moses Abigdor Lichtenstadt (1787 - 1870) was a Hebraist and Talmud scholar from Lublin, Poland.

He was known for his great charity towards poor students, and helped found public schooling for Jewish children in Odessa. He wrote a number of articles on Biblical and Talmudic subjects for various publications, as well as Mi-Mochorat ha-Shabbat (Vienna, 1860) against the Karaites.

References 

19th-century Polish scholars
Polish Hebraists
Russian Hebraists
Talmudists
18th-century Polish Jews
Writers from Lublin
1787 births
1870 deaths
Polish expatriates in Ukraine